Yuri Ivanovich Tishkov (12 March 1971  – 11 January 2003) was a Russian professional footballer, sports agent and commentator who was murdered at age 31.

Club career
He made his professional debut in the Soviet Top League in 1988 for FC Torpedo Moscow.

He retired relatively young after he was unable to fully recover from a serious injury he suffered in a Russian Cup 1993–94 game against FC Viktor-Avangard Kolomna. The injury was inflicted by Sergei Bodak (Bodak was originally banned from football for life for that foul, but the ban was lifted after one year).

Death
Tishkov was stabbed to death on 11 January 2003, in Moscow, where his body was found outside his home. He was working as player agent at the time, and it was speculated that his murder was linked to a contract dispute with one of his clients. Despite widespread publicity and pleas for information, Tishkov's murder remains unsolved.

Honours
 Soviet Top League bronze: 1988, 1991.
 Russian Premier League runner-up: 1994.
 Russian Premier League bronze: 1993, 1997.
 Russian Cup winner: 1993, 1995.
 Soviet Cup finalist: 1991.
 Russian Cup finalist: 1997.

European club competitions
 UEFA Cup 1990–91 with FC Torpedo Moscow: 5 games, 6 goals.
 UEFA Cup 1991–92 with FC Torpedo Moscow: 4 games, 1 goal.
 UEFA Cup 1992–93 with FC Torpedo Moscow: 2 games, 1 goal.
 UEFA Cup Winners' Cup 1995–96 with FC Dynamo Moscow: 5 games.
 UEFA Cup 1996–97 with FC Dynamo Moscow: 3 games.
 UEFA Intertoto Cup 1997 with FC Dynamo Moscow: 1 game.

References

1971 births
2003 deaths
Footballers from Moscow
Soviet footballers
Russian footballers
Association football forwards
Soviet Top League players
Russian Premier League players
FC Torpedo Moscow players
FC Dynamo Moscow players
FC Rubin Kazan players
Deaths by stabbing in Russia
Male murder victims
People murdered in Russia
Russian murder victims
Association football agents
2000s in Moscow
Crime in Moscow
2003 murders in Russia